God is our refuge, K. 20, is a motet for four voices in G minor by Wolfgang Amadeus Mozart. Based on Psalm 46, it was composed in July 1765 during Mozarts' stay in London on the Mozart family grand tour as a gift for the British Museum along with one other supposed work: a set of variations in A major, K. 21a.

Score
The 23-bar work is scored for four voices: soprano, alto, tenor and bass, and is written in  time.

Lyrics
God is our refuge, 
our refuge and strength,
a very present help in trouble, 
a present help in trouble.

Influence
As the manuscript for this work is still intact, one can find two separate, distinct handwritings: Wolfgang's, and his father's Leopold. It can be seen that Wolfgang most likely wrote the tempo markings, key signatures and clefs, as well as all of the notes. Leopold was suspected to have a hand in the written words after bar seven, as the young Wolfgang seemingly had trouble judging the amount of space necessary to fit in the written text (as can be seen by the wave pattern of the bar lines near measure 7).

The work was possibly based on a given melody at the time of composition; perhaps stemming from a composition written in 1765 of similar character by Jonathan Battishill. God is our refuge shows many stylistic similarities to that of 16th century English church music, which Mozart was undoubtedly exposed to whilst traveling London at the time.

References

External links

Compositions by Wolfgang Amadeus Mozart
Motets
1765 compositions
Compositions in G minor